Indiscreet is a 1931 American pre-Code comedy film directed by Leo McCarey and starring Gloria Swanson and Ben Lyon. The screenplay by Buddy G. DeSylva, Lew Brown, and Ray Henderson, based on their story Obey That Impulse, originally was written as a full-fledged musical, but only two songs – "If You Haven't Got Love" and "Come to Me" – remained when the film was released. The film is available on DVD.

Plot
Determined to start the new year off right, dress designer Geraldine "Gerry" Trent sends her unfaithful boyfriend, Jim Woodward, packing. A short time later, her friend Buster Collins introduces her to author Tony Blake. Gerry loves Tony's book,  Obey That Impulse, and finds him attractive as well. Practicing what he preaches, Tony immediately proposes marriage. Gerry just laughs, but together they have a lot of fun acting out Tony's theory, and she soon realizes that she loves and wants to marry him. First, though, she feels she must tell him about her affair with Jim despite dire warnings from her Aunt Kate. Although he's upset by the news, Tony still wants to marry her.

The next day, Gerry's sister Joan arrives home from school in France, where, unknown to Gerry, she has fallen in love with Jim. When Gerry finds out, she warns Jim to stay away from her sister, but he doesn't take the situation seriously and invites everyone to his parents’ house party. Initially, Gerry refuses to go, but when she finds out that business will prevent Tony from attending, she decides to go after all and keep an eye on Joan. Desperate to break Joan's engagement, Gerry first pretends to be a little crazy. When this doesn't work, she pretends she is still in love with Jim. While the two of them are alone together, she signals to Joan for help by singing a special song. Joan comes to her aid only to see Gerry and Jim embracing. Unfortunately, so does Tony, who has arrived at the last minute. Heartbroken, Gerry returns home, where Aunt Kate convinces her to pursue Tony who is sailing for Europe. Gerry sneaks on the boat in the seat of a car and finds Tony who asks the captain to marry them immediately.

Cast (in credits order)
Gloria Swanson as Geraldine 'Gerry' Trent
Ben Lyon as Tony Blake
Monroe Owsley as Jim Woodward
Barbara Kent as Joan Trent
Arthur Lake as Buster Collins
Maude Eburne as Aunt Kate
Henry Kolker as Mr. Woodward
Nella Walker as Mrs. Woodward

Critical reception
In May 1931 in The New York Times, film critic Mordaunt Hall gave Indiscreet a mixed review:

References

External links

1931 films
1931 romantic comedy films
American romantic comedy films
American black-and-white films
Films scored by Alfred Newman
Films directed by Leo McCarey
United Artists films
1930s English-language films
1930s American films